The Félou Hydroelectric Plant is a hydroelectric installation at the Félou Falls on the Sénégal River in Mali. It has three water turbines capable of generating 62.3 MW. The current power station replaced an older one built in the 1920s. Construction of the new power station began in October 2009 and was financed by the World Bank. It is the third Senegal River Basin Development Authority project on the river and was completed in 2014. The existing weir was refurbished with the previous  height maintained. In 1927, the previous hydroelectric power station was commissioned. It was refurbished in 1992 and had an installed capacity of 600 kW.

Between August and November the water flowing in the river generally exceeds this value allowing the plant to operate at full capacity and the excess water to pass over the weir. During the dry season (December to July) the electricity generated is reduced to about a third of the maximum output as the flow of water is limited to the  released from the Manantali Dam.

The total estimated cost is 241 million US dollars. The construction of the plant was completed in 2014.

See also

Manantali Dam – upstream
Gouina Hydroelectric Plant – upstream
Diama Dam – downstream

References

Hydroelectric power stations in Mali
Run-of-the-river power stations
Dams completed in 1927
Energy infrastructure completed in 2014
2014 establishments in Mali
Weirs
Dams in Mali
Dams on the Senegal River
Kayes Region